The Liman River is a river in northern Java, Indonesia.

Geography 
The river flows in the southwest area of Java with predominantly tropical rainforest climate (designated as Af in the Köppen-Geiger climate classification). The annual average temperature in the area is 24 °C. The warmest month is August when the average temperature is around 26 °C, and the coldest is December, at 23 °C. The average annual rainfall is 3999 mm. The wettest month is December, with an average of 567 mm rainfall, and the driest is September, with 72 mm rainfall.

See also
List of rivers of Indonesia
List of rivers of Banten

References

Rivers of Banten
Rivers of Indonesia